South Perkasie Covered Bridge is a historic wooden covered bridge located at Perkasie, Bucks County, Pennsylvania. It was built in 1832, and is a  Town truss covered bridge. The bridge once crossed Pleasant Spring Creek, but was moved and rededicated on August 15, 1959, by Congressman Willard S. Curtin as a feature in Lenape Park.  It is the oldest covered bridge in Bucks County.

The bridge was added to the National Register of Historic Places on December 1, 1980.

The bridge was heavily damaged by the remnants of Hurricane Ida in September 2021.

Gallery

References

External links

Covered bridges in Bucks County, Pennsylvania
Bridges completed in 1832
Covered bridges on the National Register of Historic Places in Pennsylvania
Bridges in Bucks County, Pennsylvania
Tourist attractions in Bucks County, Pennsylvania
Lattice truss bridges
Relocated buildings and structures in Pennsylvania
National Register of Historic Places in Bucks County, Pennsylvania
Road bridges on the National Register of Historic Places in Pennsylvania
Wooden bridges in Pennsylvania
Lattice truss bridges in the United States
1832 establishments in Pennsylvania